The Howard Vollum Award for Distinguished Accomplishment in Science and Technology is an annual award that was created by Reed College and endowed in 1975 by a grant from the Millicent Foundation, now a part of the M.J. Murdock Charitable Trust.

The award was created as a tribute to the late C. Howard Vollum, a 1936 Reed graduate and lifelong friend of the college. For his senior thesis project, Vollum built an oscilloscope; he later went on to co-found Tektronix, which revolutionized oscilloscope design and became a world leader in test, measurement, and monitoring technology. The award "recognizes and celebrates the exceptional achievement of one or more members of the scientific and technical community of the Northwest." Winners are selected for "the perseverance, creative imagination, ability to work with people, and fresh approach to problem solving that characterized Howard Vollum's career." Past recipients include Steve Jobs, Bill Gates, and Leroy Hood.

Recipients

2014 - Ivan E. Sutherland
2013 - Kip S. Thorne
2012 - Edward D. Lazowska
2011 - Lynn M. Riddiford
2010 - Brian Druker
2009 - Carl E. Wieman
2008 - B. Kenneth Koe
2007 - Stanley Fields
2006 - Daniel Bump
2005 - Linus Torvalds
2004 - Warren M. Washington
2003 - Leroy Hood
2002 - Kenneth Raymond
2000 - James T. Russell
1999 - Jane Lubchenco
1997 - Russell J. Donnelly
1996 - Edwin G. Krebs
1995 - Adele Goldberg
1994 - Brian W. Matthews
1993 - Lynwood W. Swanson
1992 - Jerry F. Franklin
1991 - Steve Jobs
1990 - Lewis H. Kleinholz
1989 - Michael L. Posner
1988 - Harold K. Lonsdale
1987 - Gertrude F. Rempfer
1986 - David Powell Shoemaker
1985 - Howard S. Mason
1984 - Bill Gates and George Streisinger
1983 - Paul Lutus
1982 - Victor Klee
1981 - M. Lowell Edwards and Albert Starr
1980 - Paul H. Emmett
1979 - Linus C. Pauling
1978 - C. Norman Winningstad
1977 - Arthur F. Scott
1976 - John M. Fluke
1975 - Douglas C. Strain

References

American awards
Reed College
Awards established in 1975